"You're the Power" is a song written by Craig Bickhardt and F.C. Collins, and recorded by American country music artist Kathy Mattea.  It was released in February 1987 as the third single from the album Walk the Way the Wind Blows.  The song reached #5 on the Billboard Hot Country Singles & Tracks chart.

Chart performance

References

1987 singles
1986 songs
Kathy Mattea songs
Songs written by Craig Bickhardt
Song recordings produced by Allen Reynolds
Mercury Records singles